Alfred Clarke (12 August 1865 – 12 June 1935) was an English cricketer. He played eight first-class matches for Surrey between 1890 and 1892.

See also
 List of Surrey County Cricket Club players

References

External links
 

1865 births
1935 deaths
English cricketers
Surrey cricketers
People from Farnworth
Sportspeople from Lancashire